Slahal (or Lahal)  is a gambling game of the indigenous peoples of the Pacific Northwest Coast, also known as stickgame, bonegame, bloodless war game, handgame, or a name specific to each language.  It is played throughout the western United States and Canada by indigenous peoples. Traditionally, the game uses the shin bones from the foreleg of a deer or other animal. The name slahal is a Chinook Jargon word.

The game is played by two opposing teams.  There are two pairs of "bones", one pair with a stripe and one without. The game also uses a set of scoring sticks (usually ten) and in some areas a "kick" or "king" stick—an extra stick won by the team who gets to start the game.

The game starts with each team dividing the scoring sticks between them, and one team receiving the four bones. Two individuals from that team take two bones each, one striped and one unstriped, and conceal them in their hands. They swap the bones between their hands and each other, singing gambling songs while they do so. The opposing team then tries to guess the position of the unmarked bones. If they are correct, they take two of the bones; if they are wrong, they pass one scoring stick to their opponents. When a team has won both pairs of bones, it is their turn to conceal them and the other team's turn to guess. The game continues until a team runs out of scoring sticks, at which point the other team wins.

The game is usually accompanied by drumming and singing used to boost the morale of the team. The side that has the bones sings, while the other tries to guess.  The musical accompaniment is also sometimes used to taunt the other team.  Players and spectators may place bets on teams, or individual matches within the game between one guess and the other team's bone hiders.

Oral histories indicate that slahal is an ancient game, dating to before the last ice age. In the Coast Salish tradition, the Creator gave stickgame to humanity as an alternative to war at the beginning of time. The game serves multiple roles in Native culture—it is at once entertainment, a family pastime, a sacred ritual and a means of economic gain through gambling.

See also 
 Spoof (game)
 Indigenous peoples of the Pacific Northwest Coast

References 

Gambling games
Guessing games
First Nations culture
Native American sports and games
Indigenous peoples of the Pacific Northwest